The following is a list of France women's national rugby union team international matches.

Overall 
France's overall international match record against all nations, updated to 21 November 2021, is as follows:

Full internationals

1980s

1990s

2000s

2010s

2020s

Other internationals

Notes

References 

France women's national rugby union team
Women's rugby union in France